Mandi is a large village in Phillaur tehsil of Jalandhar District of Punjab State, India. The village is administrated by Sarpanch Jarnail singh dhillon(also elected as block samiti pardhan of nearby 5 villages) who is elected representative of the village. It is 1 km away from census town and postal head office Apra. The village is 47.3 km from Jalandhar, 15 km from Phillaur and 117 km away from state capital Chandigarh.

Caste 
The village has schedule caste (SC) constitutes 38.00% of total population of the village followed by 35.00 % of jatt tribe most of them are Dhillon and it doesn't have any Schedule Tribe (ST) population.

Education 
The village has 3 Punjabi Medium, Co-educational primary schools (Govt. Primary School) The nearest high school (D.A.V Senior Secondary High School Mandi) is located 0.2 km and government high school is 1.5 km in Apra.

Transport

Rail 
The nearest train station is situated 15 km away in Goraya and Ludhiana Jn Railway Station is 31 km away from the village.

Air 
The nearest domestic airport is at Ludhiana which is 47 km away from Mandi. The nearest international airport is located in Chandigarh and a second nearest international airport is 141 km away in Amritsar.

References 

Villages in Jalandhar district
Villages in Phillaur tehsil